Dobieszczyn  is a settlement in the administrative district of Gmina Police, within Police County, West Pomeranian Voivodeship, in north-western Poland, close to the German border.

History 
Since the Middle Ages the area was part of Poland and the Duchy of Pomerania following Poland's fragmentation. There is a memorial to Duke Barnim II nearby, on the German side of the border, in the place where he was probably assassinated in 1295. During the Thirty Years' War, the duchy was dissolved and the area fell to Sweden. From 1815 it was part of Prussia and from 1871 also Germany, within which it was known as Entepöl and was administratively located in the Province of Pomerania. Following the defeat of Nazi Germany in World War II in 1945 the area became again part of Poland, however, the settlement was initially occupied by the Soviets until October 1945. Administratively it was part of the Szczecin Voivodeship, since 1999 the West Pomeranian Voivodeship.

The border was opened to free travel in 2008, after Poland joined the Schengen Agreement.

The name of the settlement comes from the Old Polish male name Dobiesław.

Demography
Historic population of the settlement:
 1864 – 13
 1939 – 4
 2001 – 5

Transport
The Voivodeship road 115 runs through the village, and connects it with the nearby city of Szczecin.

Tourism 
 Bicycle trail (red  Trail "Puszcza Wkrzańska"-Szlak "Puszcza Wkrzańska")  in an area of Dobieszczyn in Wkrzanska Forest

See also 
 Police
 Szczecin

References

Dobieszczyn